The Jim Thorpe Association is a civic and charity organization based in Oklahoma City, Oklahoma. Its parent corporation is the Jim Thorpe Athletic Club. It is named in memory of multi-sport legend Jim Thorpe.

Jim Thorpe Award

The organization has awarded the Jim Thorpe Award to the top defensive back in college football since 1986.

To determine the awards, a screening committee follows the players during the season.  The award is presented at an annual awards banquet along with the commemorative plate of spaghetti.

Lifetime achievement award

Oklahoma Sports Hall of Fame
The Oklahoma Sports Hall of Fame, founded in 1986, became a part of the Jim Thorpe Association in 1989. At least two inductees are selected for the Hall of Fame each year, based on athletic accomplishments and identification with the State of Oklahoma.

See also
 Statue of Jim Thorpe

References

External links
. The Jim Thorpe Association and Oklahoma Sports Hall of Fame official website

Organizations based in Oklahoma
Sports halls of fame